A Fenwick tree or binary indexed tree (BIT) is a data structure that can efficiently update elements and calculate prefix sums in a table of numbers.

This structure was proposed by Boris Ryabko in 1989
with a further modification published in 1992.
It has subsequently become known under the name Fenwick tree after Peter Fenwick, who described this structure in his 1994 article.

When compared with a flat array of numbers, the Fenwick tree achieves a much better balance between two operations: element update and prefix sum calculation. A flat array of  numbers can either store the elements or the prefix sums. In the first case, computing prefix sums requires linear time; in the second case, updating the array elements requires linear time (in both cases, the other operation can be performed in constant time). Fenwick trees allow both operations to be performed in  time. This is achieved by representing the numbers as a tree with  nodes where the value of each node in the tree is the prefix sum of the array from the index of the parent (inclusive) up to the index of the node (exclusive). The tree itself is implicit and can be stored as an array of  numbers, with the implicit root node omitted from the array. The tree structure allows the operations of element retrieval, element update, prefix sum, and range sum to be performed using only  node accesses.

Motivation

Given a table of elements, it is sometimes desirable to calculate the running total of values up to each index according to some associative binary operation (addition on integers being by far the most common). Fenwick trees provide a method to query the running total at any index, in addition to allowing changes to the underlying value table and having all further queries reflect those changes.

Fenwick trees are particularly designed to implement the arithmetic coding algorithm, which maintains counts of each symbol produced and needs to convert those to the cumulative probability of a symbol less than a given symbol.  Development of operations it supports were primarily motivated by use in that case.

Using a Fenwick tree it requires only  operations to compute any desired cumulative sum, or more generally the sum of any range of values (not necessarily starting at zero). It is also possible to construct extensions of this data structure to quickly compute cumulative sums on -dimensional arrays in  time.

Description
A Fenwick tree is most easily understood by considering a one-based array  with  elements. The corresponding Fenwick tree has  nodes with an implicit node 0 at the root. Each level  of the tree contains nodes with indices corresponding to sums of  distinct powers of 2 (with  representing an empty sum 0). For example, level  contains nodes  and level  contains nodes  The parent of a given node can be found by clearing the last set bit (LSB) in its index, corresponding to the smallest power of 2 in its sum. For example, the parent of 6 = 1102 is 4 = 1002 .

The below diagram shows the structure of a 16-node Fenwick tree, corresponding to a 15-element array A:

Let . Note that the indices in this range do not directly correspond to children of : for example, the range of responsibility for node 2 is  but node 1 is not a child of node 2. The root node 0 contains the sum of the empty range  with value 0.

Typically, the Fenwick tree is implemented as an implicit data structure using a flat array analogous to implementations of a binary heap. In this representation, the root node 0 is omitted and the array indices directly correspond to node indices in the tree (using 1-based indexing).

The initial process of building the Fenwick tree over a table of values runs in  time. Other efficient operations include locating the index of a value if all values are positive, or all indices with a given value if all values are non-negative. Also supported is the scaling of all values by a constant factor in  time.

Range query 
To find the prefix sum up to any given index (the "range query" operation), add up the values of nodes along the path from the current index to the root of the tree (which is trivially an empty sum, 0).

For example, say one wishes to find the sum of the first eleven values. Eleven is 10112 in binary. This contains three 1-bits, so three node values must be added: those at nodes 11=10112, 10=10102, and 8=10002 (the implicit root node of 00002 can be ignored). These contain the sums of A[11], A[9,10], and A[1,8], respectively (where A[i,j] = {A[i], A[i+1], ..., A[j]}) .

Point update 
To update the value in a Fenwick tree at index  (corresponding to assigning  a new value) (the "point update" operation):

 Compute the delta .
 Then, while index :
 Update the index by adding LSB: 
 Add  to the value at node .

For example, updating value 11=10112 in a 16-element array requires updating 10112, (10112 + 12 = 11002), and (11002 + 1002 = 100002).  These contain the sums of A[11], A[9,12], and A[1,16], respectively. Again, the maximum number of nodes that need to be updated is limited by the number of bits in the size of the array, and the time complexity is thus .

Building the tree 
However, an alternate approach uses dynamic programming to build the tree up incrementally along increasing indices. Initialization proceeds as follows:

 Copy array  into array  containing tree values
 For each index i from 1 to n:
 Let . This is the first node larger than  that contains  in its range of responsibility.
 If , update value of node at j: 

It can be shown that at the point that index  is reached in the loop,  is already the correct Fenwick value for node . If  is a leaf node (with only one element in its range of responsibility) this holds trivially. If  is an internal node, the loop ensures that it has been updated with all range sums within its own range, so it will contain the correct Fenwick value.

Since each update happens at most once per index, the resulting algorithm is  time complexity.

A less efficient  algorithm for constructing the tree works in two passes: first convert  to a prefix sum (which takes  time), then iterating backwards from n..1, compute each node's range sum by computing the difference of prefix sums: .

Extension to multiple dimensions 
A 2D Fenwick tree (2D BIT) can be constructed as a 1D Fenwick tree where each node of the tree contains a 1D Fenwick tree, and stores range sums for submatrices of a 2D matrix A[m,n]. The tree representation remains implicit and the data is stored in an m x n array where position (i, j) in the array corresponds to the jth node of the ith Fenwick tree.

Point update and range query are implemented similarly to the 1D case, but using nested loops (iterating along the column dimension (sub-tree) in the inner loop, and iterating along the row dimension (main tree) in the outer loop).

This idea can be extended to tensors with arbitrary number of dimensions d, with time complexity  for range-query and point-update (assuming the tensor is size n along each axis).

Implementation

Basic implementation in C 
// SIZE should be 1 + a power of 2.
int A[SIZE];

// Least Significant Bit of i having a value of 1
#define LSB(i) ((i) & -(i))

// Returns the sum of the first i elements (indices 0 to i)
// Equivalent to range_sum(0, i)
int prefix_sum(int i) {
	int sum = A[0];
	for (; i != 0; i -= LSB(i))
		sum += A[i];
	return sum;
}

// Add delta to element with index i (zero-based)
void add(int i, int delta) {
	if (i == 0) {
		A[0] += delta;
		return;
	}
	for (; i < SIZE; i+= LSB(i))
		A[i] += delta;
}

Useful functions in C 

// Returns the sum of elements from i + 1 to j
// Equivalent to prefix_sum(j) - prefix_sum(i), but slightly faster
int range_sum(int i, int j) {
	int sum = 0;
	for (; j > i; j -= LSB(j))
		sum += A[j];
	for (; i > j; i -= LSB(i))
		sum -= A[i];
	return sum;
}

// Convert A[] in place to Fenwick tree form
void init(void) {
	for (int i = 1; i < SIZE; ++i) {
		int j = i + LSB(i);
		if (j < SIZE)
			A[j] += A[i];
	}
}

// Convert back to array of per-element counts
void fini(void) {
	for (int i = SIZE - 1; i > 0; --i) {
		int j = i + LSB(i);
		if (j < SIZE)
			A[j] -= A[i];
	}
}

// Return a single element's value
int get(int i) {
	return range_sum(i, i + 1);
}

// Set (as opposed to adjust) a single element's value
void set(int i, int value) {
	add(i, value - get(i));
}

// Find the largest i with prefix_sum(i) <= value.
// NOTE: Requires that all values are non-negative!
unsigned int rank_query(int value) {
	int i = 0, j = SIZE - 1;
	// j is a power of 2.

    value -= A[0];
	for (; j > 0;  j >>= 1) {
		if (i + j < SIZE && A[i + j] <= value) {
			value -= A[i + j];
			i += j;
		}
	}
	return i;
}

Implementation in C++ 
class FenwickTree {
private:
    vector<int> data;

    int getParent(int i) const {
        return i - (i & (-i));
    }

    int getNext(int i) const {
        return i + (i & (-i));
    }

public:
    FenwickTree(int n) : data(n+1, 0) {
    }

    int getSum(int i) const {
        int sum = 0;
        ++i;
        while (i > 0) {
            sum += data[i];
            i = getParent(i);
        }
        return sum;
    }

    void update(int i, int v) {
        ++i;
        while (i < data.size()) {
            data[i] += v;
            i = getNext(i);
        }
    }
};

See also
 Order statistic tree
 Prefix sums
 Segment tree

References

External links
 A tutorial on Fenwick Trees on TopCoder
 An article on Fenwick Trees on Algorithmist
 An entry on Fenwick Trees on Polymath wiki
stack exchange

Trees (data structures)
Soviet inventions
Russian inventions